William Soloweyko (December 1, 1931 – October 3, 2000), better known by his ring name Klondike Bill, was a Canadian professional wrestler. Trained by Stu Hart in Calgary, Alberta, Canada, he wrestled in various National Wrestling Alliance territories throughout the 1960s and 1970s, before moving onto World Championship Wrestling.

Professional wrestling career 
Bill was trained by Stu Hart in the famous Dungeon in Calgary. He began his career wrestling as Bill "The Brute" Soloweyko in Hart's local promotion, Stampede Wrestling before moving on to other territories. During his career he formed various tag teams with wrestlers such as Whipper Billy Watson and Skull Murphy. He performed in WWWF in 1964.

Under the name Klondike Bill, he was hired by Jim Crockett during the 1970s to build guard rails and rings for Mid-Atlantic Championship Wrestling, and was also a road agent for World Championship Wrestling. During the late 1990s, Bill was involved in a storyline that saw Eric Bischoff demoted as president and forced to set up a ring under Bill's supervision.

Bill was also known for being the only person to consume two 72-ounce steaks at the Big Texan Steak Ranch in the one-hour time limit back in the 1960s.

Death 
Soloweyko died on October 3, 2000 from a neuromuscular disorder.

Championships and accomplishments 
50th State Big Time Wrestling
NWA Hawaii Heavyweight Championship (1 time)
Championship Wrestling from Florida
NWA Southern Heavyweight Championship (1 time)
Georgia Championship Wrestling
NWA National Television Championship (1 time)
Japan Pro Wrestling Alliance
All Asia Tag Team Championship (1 time) - with Skull Murphy
NWA Central States
NWA North American Tag Team Championship (1 time) - with Ron Etchison
NWA Toronto
NWA International Tag Team Championship (1 time) - with Whipper Billy Watson
NWA Tri-State
United States Tag Team Championship - with Luke Brown

References

Further reading 
 SLAM! Wrestling Canadian Hall of Fame: Klondike Bill
 SLAM! Wrestling: Rallying around an ailing Klondike Bill
 SLAM! Wrestling Guest Column: What Klondike Bill means to me
 SLAM! Wrestling: Klondike Bill passes away

External links 
 

1931 births
2000 deaths
Canadian male professional wrestlers
Professional wrestlers from Calgary
Stampede Wrestling alumni
Neurological disease deaths in North Carolina
Deaths from neuromuscular disease
20th-century professional wrestlers
All Asia Tag Team Champions
NWA International Tag Team Champions (Toronto version)
NWA National Television Champions